State Highway 81 (SH-81) is a state highway in Cassia County, Idaho. It also has a short spur route connecting the highway to Interstate 84 (I-84) at the Yale Interchange.

Prior to its designation as SH-81 in 1972, the highway was part of U.S. Route 30S (US-30S), a multi-state national highway that traveled from Burley to Granger, Wyoming.

Route description

State Highway 81 begins at an intersection with SH-77 in Malta, located north of the Utah state line. The highway travels north, following the eastern foothills of the Cotterell Mountains and the Raft River valley, through Idahome to Interstate 84, which it parallels for several miles heading northwest. SH-81 completes its turn west and heads towards Declo, intersecting SH-77. The highway continues west along the southern side of the Snake River, parallel to the Eastern Idaho Railroad. It terminates at an intersection with US-30 (co-signed with Interstate 84 Business) south of Burley Municipal Airport on the banks of the Snake River, just east of downtown Burley.

History
U.S. Route 30S, which traveled from Burley to Granger, Wyoming via Logan, Utah, was established in 1926 as an alternative route to U.S. Route 30N. It was moved to the completed Interstate 80N (later I-84) in 1970, and decommissioned entirely in 1972. SH-81 was established by the Idaho State Board of Highway Directors on September 12, 1972, to preserve state maintenance of the highway between Burley and the Utah state line.

In 1983, the Idaho Transportation Board studied an extension of SH-81 from Burley to Twin Falls to replace an existing section of US 30. It was later truncated in the early 1990s to its current terminus at SH-77 in Malta.

Major intersections

Spur route

See also

 List of state highways in Idaho

References

External links

081
Transportation in Cassia County, Idaho
U.S. Route 30